hMailServer is a free email server for Windows created by Martin Knafve. It runs as a Windows service and includes administration tools for management and backup. It has support for IMAP, POP3, and SMTP email protocols. It can use external database engines such as MySQL, MS SQL or PostgreSQL, or an internal MS SQL Compact Edition engine to store configuration and index data. The actual email messages are stored on disk in a raw MIME format. It has active support and development forums.

Common features such as multiple-domain support, aliases, catch-all and basic mailing lists are present. Users can be authenticated both against the local hMailServer user system and against an external Active Directory.

AntiSpam
hMailServer offers a number of different AntiSpam mechanisms:

 Host based DNS Blacklisting (DNSBL)
 URL based DNS blacklisting (SURBL)
 Greylisting (must retry sending for the message to succeed)
 SPF
 Built in SpamAssassin integration
 DKIM (in version 5.1)

AntiVirus
hMailServer has built in support for ClamWin/ClamAV. It's possible to execute any command line virus scanner.

Other features
 Domain and account signatures (for legal and advertising footers)
 Server side rules (rules for individual accounts available in v5)
 Retrieval of messages from external POP3 accounts
 Quotas on domain, mailbox, and individual message sizes
 Plus addressing (using + to make a virtual alias for an account specific to a task, as seen in Gmail)
 Attachment blocking (based on attachment extension)
 Custom SMTP routes for specific domains (can be used to set up MX backup, forwarding and more)
 API (it's possible to write hMailServer scripts using VBScript and JScript)
 Built-in support for SSL

Integration
 ClamAV anti-virus software
 SquirrelMail for webmail, (requires IIS or Apache); spell-checking available
 Roundcube for webmail, also requires auxiliary database provider such as mySQL to operate
 SpamAssassin spam filtering

History
The hMailServer project was started in 2003. Up until 2008 and version 4, the project was licensed under the GPL. Versions 5.0 to 5.3 were proprietary. Since version 5.4, hMailServer is licensed under the GNU AGPL 3. 

The current version of hMailServer appears to be open source again. This is also noted on the hMailServer home page.

See also
Comparison of mail servers
List of mail server software

References

External links
 
 An illustrated guide to installing and setting up hMailServer from scratch

Message transfer agents
Free email server software
Free software programmed in C++
Free software programmed in C Sharp
Windows-only free software
Software using the GNU AGPL license